Katariga is a small community in Sagnarigu District in the Northern Region of Ghana. It has a dispersed settlement having Kumbuyili, Sugashee and Gurugu as its neighboring communities. Farming is the most common occupation in this community.  It is one of the few communities headed by a female(Tindana) in the Northern Region .

See also
Suburbs of Tamale (Ghana) metropolis

References 

Communities in Ghana
Suburbs of Tamale, Ghana